Infra City is a 70 metres tall skyscraper hotel in Upplands Väsby in Stockholm.

Buildings and structures in Stockholm
Skyscrapers in Sweden
Skyscraper hotels
Hotels in Sweden